Trend is a town in North Jutland (Nordjylland), it is situated next to Bjørnsholm Bay and the closest city/town is Overlade. Trend have a caravan space and a minigolf course. The town is also defined a summer house city since the most of city's houses' primary use is as summer houses. Trend also have an inn, that have the name Trend inn (Trend kro). The name Trend is comes from Trende mill that was built by Vitskøl monastery. The village have a camping place. The village is located 22 km west from Aars and it located around 60 km west south from Aalborg.

Beach 
Beach near the cottage areas. From Vitskøl monastery to the south of Trend city you will find Trend beach. The many home residents by Trend use this beach, and it is especially very popular with the kids as they can wade far out into the water before it gets deep. Also surfers enjoy the beach as there is shallow on a several kilometers long stretch and far into the Limfjord.

See also

Vesthimmerland Municipality
North Denmark Region

References

Vesthimmerland Municipality
Towns and settlements in Vesthimmerland Municipality